The International Skating Union has organised the World Allround Speed Skating Championships for Men since 1893. Unofficial Championships were held in the years 1889–1892.

History

Distances used
 In 1889, three distances had to be skated: 1/2 mile (805 m) — 1 mile (1,609 m) — 2 miles (3,219 m).
 In the years 1890–1892, four distances had to be skated: 1/2 mile (805 m) — 1 mile (1,609 m) — 2 miles (3,219 m) — 5 miles (8,047 m).
 Since 1893, four distances have to be skated:  —  —  —  (the big combination).

Ranking systems used
 In 1889, one could only win the World Championships by winning all three distances. If no one won all three distances, no winner would be declared. Silver and bronze medals were not awarded.
 In the years 1890–1907, one could only win the World Championships by winning at least three of the four distances, so there would be no World Champion if no skater won at least three distances. Silver and bronze medals were never awarded.
 In the years 1908–1925, ranking points were awarded (1 point for 1st place, 2 points for 2nd place, and so on); the final ranking was then decided by ordering the skaters by lowest point totals. The rule that a skater winning at least three distances was automatically World Champion was still in effect, though, so the ranking could be affected by that. Silver and bronze medals were awarded now as well.
 In the years 1926–1927, the ranking points on each distance were percentage points, calculated from a skater's time and the current world record time. Apart from that, the system used was the same as in the immediately preceding years.
 Since 1928, the samalog system has been in use. However, the rule that a skater winning at least three distances was automatically World Champion remained in effect until (and including) 1986. It was abolished as a result of three-distance-winner (and thus World Champion) Rolf Falk-Larssen having a worse samalog score than silver medal winner Tomas Gustafson in 1983.

Records
 Sven Kramer has won a total of nine world championships, in 2007, 2008, 2009, 2010, 2012, 2013, 2015, 2016 and 2017. Before Kramer, Clas Thunberg and Oscar Mathisen held the record with five world championships.
 Kramer has won four consecutive world championships, in 2007, 2008, 2009 and 2010.

Medal winners

Unofficial championships

Official championships

All-time medal count

Unofficial World Championships of 1889–1892, 1940 and 1946 (not recognized by the ISU) included

Multiple medalists
Boldface denotes active skaters and highest medal count among all skaters (including those who are not included in these tables) per type.

See also
 World Allround Speed Skating Championships for Women

Notes

References

Allround
All-round speed skating
Recurring sporting events established in 1893